Boyan Gaytanov is a Bulgarian footballer, who plays as a striker.

External links
 
 

1989 births
Living people
Bulgarian footballers
First Professional Football League (Bulgaria) players
Association football forwards
PFC Lokomotiv Mezdra players
FC Montana players
FC Sportist Svoge players